Vichitra Kutumbam is a 1969 Indian Telugu-language comedy film, produced by V. K. P. Sunkavalli under the Sriraj Art Films banner and directed by K. S. Prakash Rao. It stars N. T. Rama Rao, Savitri, Krishna, Shobhan Babu and Vijaya Nirmala, with music composed by T. V. Raju. A remake of this film in Hindi with Dilip Kumar was shelved.

Plot
The film begins in a village where Raja Shekaram a reputed advocate, leads a happy family life with his poltroon wife Kamala and short tempered brother Krishna. In the same village, Zamindar Nagaraju a malicious, for which his father empowers the property in the name of younger son Raghava. Therefore, Nagaraju spurns Raghava when Rajashekar and Kamala foster him and presently he is parked at Russia. Parallelly, volatile Krishna strikes everyone in the village. Since Kamala endears him as her son she takes a vow and bars his blemish. Besides, Krishna falls for Kamala's naughty sister Radha. Meanwhile, Raja Shekaram becomes a tough nut to Nagaraju when he intimidates him regarding their  which he withholds bequeathed by his father-in-law. Learning it, Kamala decides to recover the amount and lands at his residence. On her back, she witnesses a murder done by Nagaraju's acolyte Singanna. After some time, Raghava returns marrying a Russian girl Julie when Nagaraju gives them a warm welcome. Soon, the couple moves for a honeymoon when conspire to eliminate them through Singanna.

During the interval, Nagaraju invites Kamala and knives against Raja Shekaram. Listening to it, enraged Krishna seeks to hit him when Kamala obstructs. Thereupon, begrudged Nagaraju affirms to knock him out within a month. Immediately, he files a false allegation of an attempt to murder case on Krishna. In the court, surprising, Kamala claims Krishna as guilty and he is sentenced for 3 months when Rajashekaram denounces her for the deed. Later he realizes her virtue when she professes the actuality regarding the demonic face of Nagaraju and the crime she has noticed. At that moment, Nagaraju ruses by blazoning the death of Raghava & Julie, indeed he captures them. Before long, adversity, Singanna is identified, so, Nagaraju hides him. Just as, Kamala recognizes him as the homicide of the crime she has witnessed but denies to give a statement as terror-stricken of Nagaraju. At the same time, Raja Shekaram learns regarding the survival of Raghava & Julie when Krishna too releases. Right now, Raja Shekaram makes a play as a dreadful goon Gandra Ganganna and counterfeits that he has seized Krishna. Being cognizant of it, Kamala accuses and confronts Nagaraju. Thus, Nagaraju intrigues to eliminate Singanna when Raja Shekaram rescues him. At last, the entire family hook on and ceases Nagaraju. Finally, the movie ends on a happy note.

Cast

Soundtrack
Music composed by T. V. Raju. Lyrics were written by C. Narayana Reddy.

References

External links 
 

1969 films
Films scored by T. V. Raju
1960s Telugu-language films
Films directed by K. S. Prakash Rao